The Photographic Convention of United Kingdom (PCUK) was founded in 1886 and held its first convention in the city of Derby, England, in August of that year. 

The founding members were a mixture of professional photographers and wealthy amateurs. Prominent professional photographers present at the first meeting included William England, principal photographer with the London Stereoscopic Company; Richard Keene, who later became a member of The Brotherhood of the Linked Ring and Alfred Seaman who established a large number of studios across the Midlands and North of England. The leading pictorialist photographer Henry Peach Robinson was an early member and was elected President in 1896. William Crooke the prominent Scottish professional photographer was elected president in 1899. Many of the founding members were also members of the Royal Photographic Society but sought to establish an organisation with a more informal and sociable purpose- ‘combining the features of a pleasurable outing with photographic mental friction.’

Attendance at the first meeting was 48 but grew rapidly over coming years to reach 328 by the 1898 event. The pattern of the convention was to choose a town where they would be 'hosted' by a local photographic society. A large hotel was chosen as the convention headquarters and three to four days were devoted to a programme of lectures, outings, exhibitions and dinners.

Conventions of the Victorian era were held in:
 1886 Derby
 1887 Glasgow
 1888 Birmingham
 1889 London
 1890 Chester
 1892 Edinburgh
 1893 Plymouth
 1894 Dublin
 1895 Shrewsbury
 1896 Leeds
 1897 Great Yarmouth
 1898 Glasgow
 1899 Gloucester
 1900 Newcastle upon Tyne
 1901 Oxford

During the nineteenth century the Convention was a lively focus for debate and experiment around photography. After the First World War interest waned and the PCUK was kept running by an increasingly ageing and declining membership. It finally ceased operating in 1935.

References

External links
 Alfred Seaman and the Photographic Convention of the United Kingdom. History of the PCUK illustrated with stereoviews by one of its founder members.
 Edinburgh Photo History -including interesting material on the PCUK
 Leeds and Bradford Victorian Photographic Studios and material on the Photographic Convention in Leeds

Photography organizations established in the 19th century
Organizations established in 1886
Organizations disestablished in 1935
British photography organisations
1886 establishments in the United Kingdom
Arts organizations established in the 1880s